Community Centres Georgia is a project of The Public Service Development Agency, a Legal Entity of Public Law operating under the Ministry of Justice of Georgia. Community Centres provides a variety of public services, these include the services of the Public Service Development Agency, the National Agency of Public Registry, the National Archives of Georgia, the Social Service Agency and Ministry of Agriculture of Georgia.  Services are made available at Community Centres throughout the country. Currently, Community Centres provides more than 200 services.

Branches

Operating Centres 

 Shashiani - Gurjaani Municipality 
 Sartichala - Gardabani Municipality
 Gomi - Khashuri Municipality
 Ruisi - Kareli Municipality
 Chaladidi - Khobi Municipality
 Khevi - Kharagauli Municipality
 Manglisi - Tetritskaro Municipality
 Koda - Tetritskaro Municipality
 Poka - Ninotsminda Municipality
 Nigoiti - Lanchkhuti Municipality
 Jvari - Tsalenjikha Municipality
 Shorapani - Zestaponi Municipality
 Kvareltskali - Akhmeta Municipality
 Mukhaestate - Kobuleti Municipality
 Geguti - Tskaltubo Municipality
 Mejvriskhevi - Gori Municipality
 Kachreti - Gurjaani Municipality
 Khidistavi - Chokhatauri Municipality
 Nukriani - Sighnaghi Municipality
 Korbouli - Sachkhere Municipality
 Ghoresha - Kharagauli Municipality
 Kazreti - Bolnisi Municipality
 Shilda - Kvareli Municipality
 Orsantia - Zugdidi Municipality
 Kvemo Natanebi - Ozurgeti Municipality
 Kabali - Lagodekhi Municipality
 Lentekhi - Lentekhi Municipality
 Chakvi - Kobuleti Municipality
 Khreiti - Chiatura Municipality
 Sadakhlo - Marneuli Municipality
 Rukhi - Zugdidi Municipality
 Didi Jikhaishi - Samtredia Municipality
 Martkopi - Gardabani Municipality
 Iormughanlo - Sagarejo Municipality

Centres Under Construction 

 Arkhiloskalo - Dedoplistskaro Municipality
 Tkviavi - Gori Municipality
 Berdzenauli - Kareli Municipality
 Kumurdo - Akhalkalaki Municipality
 Baraleti - Akhalkalaki Municipality
 Kitskhi - Kharagauli Municipality
 Tsalka - Tsalka Municipality
 Lajana - Tsageri Municipality
 Zeda Usakhelo - Chiatura Municipality
 Vale - Akhaltsikhe Municipality

History 
The Public Service Development Agency, a Legal Entity of Public Law operating under the Ministry of Justice of Georgia, has been working for the enhancement of the capacity of local governments over the past several years. The Georgian government has implemented a number of significant reforms in the public sector by using information technologies. As a result of these reforms, the population in cities and municipal centers can use quality services, though the access of rural population to services offered by the state is still restricted.

Since 2011, the Agency, with the financial assistance from the European Union, has been implementing the project named  “Introduction of E-Governance in Local Governments”. The project aims at building capacity of local governments through improving governance in local government entities, providing quality services to local population and developing local infrastructure. In the first phase of the project, Public Service Development Agency drew up the concept of community centers.

Community centers enable local population to get more than 200 public and private services without leaving their villages. Users of the community centers can enjoy services rendered by the Public Service Development Agency, the National Archive of Georgia, the National Agency of Public Registry, Social Service Agency and Ministry of Agriculture of Georgia. Centers also provide services of private companies - Magticom and Liberty Bank.

A community center is a space equipped with modern infrastructure and technology. Centers are staffed with employees, recruited on a competitive basis among the local population and trained to provide the central government and private sector services by means of e-governance. Moreover, a modern digital library, free Internet service, computers and conference call equipment are available to local population. Centers host Local Government representative office and offer a space for fostering civic engagement activities on the ground. Free Internet, computers, conference call equipment and modern e-library services are also available to individual citizens.

Apart from providing access to services, Community Centers perform a role of mediator between the population and the government. The central and local governments as well as civil society representatives are able to use Community Centers for communicating with the local population; introducing new services, initiatives, legislative changes and organizing public awareness raising events.

With the financial support from the European Union, initially three pilot Community Centers were built in the villages of Shashiani, Sartichala and Gomi. After the piloting of the Centers proved to be successful, it was decided to further expand the initiative countrywide by introducing this concept of public service delivery in other rural areas of Georgia.

Mission 

 To create new opportunities for rural development and self-realization by means of modern technological achievements and intellectual resources.
 To strengthen the capacity of local self-governments in efficiently implementing their powers by using modern technologies, comfortable infrastructure and qualified personnel.

Aims 

 To enhance the access to quality services for local population without leaving their villages
 To ensure the access to information technologies
 To create equal conditions for capacity building of rural population
 To stimulate civic engagement in rural areas

Sources
 Official Website

Community centres
Government of Georgia (country)